Daphne Njie Efundem (born 20 September 1989) known professionally as Daphne is a Cameroonian urban pop singer. She kicked off her musical career professionally with her song  "Rastafari" and got popular via the song Calée. Daphné is married with presently no children.

Discography

Here to Stay (2016)
 The Eye (feat. Crispy & Flames)
 Kumba Water
 Mother's Love
 Famla
 Madingwa
 One Spirit
 Groove (Saka)
 Allez (feat. Feuturist)
 I Do
 Sunshine
 Gunshot
 Ovasabi (feat. M-Pro)
 Haters
 Shubidu (Dark Angel)
 Ya song
 Reflection
 Broken
 Ndolo
 Rastafari
 Calée

References 

Living people
1989 births
21st-century Cameroonian women singers